Xiuzhou or Xiu Prefecture was a zhou (prefecture) in imperial China, centering on modern Jiaxing, Zhejiang, China. Its administrative area contained most of modern Shanghai. It was created by the Wuyue kingdom in 938; in 1195, the Song dynasty renamed it Jiaxing Prefecture.

Geography
The administrative region of Xiu Prefecture in the Song dynasty was in modern and northern Zhejiang and southern and central Shanghai. It probably includes parts of modern: 
Under the administration of Jiaxing, Zhejiang:
Jiaxing
Pinghu
Tongxiang
Haiyan County
Jiashan County
Under the administration of Shanghai:
Shanghai (except for Jiading District, Baoshan District and Chongming County)

See also
Jiaxing Prefecture

References
 

Prefectures of Wuyue
Liangzhe West Circuit
Former prefectures in Zhejiang
Former prefectures in Shanghai